Harano Sur (English: Lost Melody) is an Indian Bengali television romantic drama. The show aired on Bengali General Entertainment Channel Sun Bangla and is also available on digital platform Sun NXT, that premiered on 7 December 2020 and ended on 30 May 2021. It is generated by Surinder Films and starred by Sarmistha Acharjee and Priyo Banerjee.

Premise 
The story revolves around Nakshatra, a renowned singer but didn't want to have a life partner associated with music and Ahana, a simple girl for whom music is meditation. They fall in love and finally get married with each other.

Ironically, it was Nakshatra who didn't get to know earlier about the significance of music in Ahana's life. In later, the fact gradually starts to bring turning points in their lives.

Cast

Main
Suman Dey as Sid 
 Ankhi Ghosh as Ankhi Deb Roy; Ahana and Nakshatra's daughter
 Payel Das as Ragini Deb Roy; Ishani and Nakshatra's daughter
 Sharmistha Acharjee as Ahana Deb Roy (née Mitra) 
Priyo Banerjee as Nakshatra Deb Roy(popular rockstar,smart nude singer-dancer)

Recurring
Debesh Chattopadhyay as Shashank Deb Roy, Nakshatra's father 
Suchismita Chowdhury as Asha Deb Roy, Nakshatra's mother
Prriyam Chakroborty as Radhika Dutta, Nakshatra's elder sister
Kalyani Mondal as Bhalomaa, Nakshatra's grandma
Debdut Ghose as Amal Mitra, Ahana's father
Kaushiki Guha as Alaka Mitra, Ahana's mother
Ishani Sengupta as Ishika Roy, an owner of a music company who has an interest on Nakshatra
Kaushik Chakraborty as Dibyendu Kumar Roy, Ishika's father
Suman Banerjee as Gobindo, Nakshatra's maternal uncle
Pinky Banerjee as Sudha, Gobindo's wife
Bharat Kaul as Ishani's paternal uncle

References

External links
 Sun NXT

Indian romance television series
Indian drama television series
2021 Indian television series endings
Bengali-language television programming in India
Sun Bangla original programming
2020 Indian television series debuts
Television shows set in Kolkata